Riccardo Ghedin and Stéphane Robert were the defending champions but decided not to participate.
Pierre-Hugues Herbert and Albano Olivetti defeated Paul Hanley and Jordan Kerr 7–5, 1–6, [10–7] in the final to win the title.

Seeds

Draw

Draw

References
 Main Draw

Orange Open Guadeloupe - Doubles
2012 Doubles